The Caprimulginae or  typical nightjars are a nocturnal bird subfamily within the nightjar family, Caprimulgidae.  They are medium-size with long wings, short legs, and very short bills.  They usually nest on the ground. They feed on flying insects.

They have small feet, of little use for walking, and long pointed wings. Their soft plumage is cryptically coloured to resemble bark or leaves. Some species perch facing along a branch, rather than across it as birds usually do. This helps to conceal them during the day. The female lays two patterned eggs directly onto bare ground.

They are mostly active in the late evening and early morning or at night and feed on moths and other large flying insects. The bill opens very wide and has a slightly hooked upper tip.

They are similar in most respects to the nighthawks, but generally have slightly longer bills and plumage that is softer.

Subfamily Caprimulginae — (typical nightjars) 
Genus Nyctipolus – (2 species)
Genus Nyctidromus – (2 species)
Genus Phalaenoptilus – common poorwill
Genus Siphonorhis – (2 living species)
Genus Nyctiphrynus – (4 species)
Genus Caprimulgus – (40 species, including the European nightjar)
Genus Setopagis – (4 species)
Genus Gactornis – collared nightjar
Genus Antrostomus – (12 species)
Genus Hydropsalis – (4 species)
Genus Uropsalis (2 species)
Genus Macropsalis – long-trained nightjar
Genus Eleothreptus – (2 species)
Genus Systellura – (2 species)